The Vietnam War Memorial, also known as the Vietnam War Commemorative Monument, is a war memorial commemorating veterans of the Vietnam War in Clackamas County, installed in Milwaukie, Oregon's Scott Park, in the United States. The memorial was dedicated on November 11 (Veterans Day), 2017, and rededicated in 2020 following construction of the nearby Ledding Library. The obelisk was designed by sculptor Bruce Palone.

See also

 List of Vietnam War monuments and memorials

References

External links
 

2017 establishments in Oregon
2017 sculptures
Buildings and structures in Clackamas County, Oregon
Military monuments and memorials in the United States
Milwaukie, Oregon
Monuments and memorials in Oregon
Obelisks in the United States
Outdoor sculptures in Oregon
Vietnam War monuments and memorials in the United States